Upper Catesby is a hamlet in the civil parish of Catesby, Northamptonshire, about  southwest of Daventry. The population is included in the civil parish of Hellidon.

Archaeology

Village
The village's name means 'farm/settlement of Katr/Kati'.

In 1389 Upper Catesby was recorded as Overcatsby. It is a shrunken village. The modern hamlet has only a handful of 19th- and 20th-century houses, but is surrounded by numerous earthen features showing where cottages and the main village street had been. Most of the fields around the former village still have clear ridge and furrow marks from the ploughing of the medieval arable farming with an open field system divided into narrow strips.

Catesby House
It was built in 1863 and enlarged in 1894. It includes 16th-century linenfold panelling said to come from Catesby Priory, and 17th-century panelling, doorcases and a stair with barley-sugar balusters, all from the previous 17th-century Catesby House that was in Lower Catesby.

Catesby Tunnel

Catesby Tunnel is a disused railway tunnel on the route of the former Great Central Main Line.

References

Sources

Deserted medieval villages in Northamptonshire
Hamlets in Northamptonshire
West Northamptonshire District